Stephen Estaban Kelen OAM (Hungarian: Kelen István; 21 March 1912 – 1 May 2003) was a Hungarian-Australian sportsman, journalist, author, and playwright. He won seven gold medals at the World Table Tennis Championships in the 1920s and 1930s. After moving to Australia in 1939 he had a long writing career in English.

Early life
Kelen was born in Budapest in 1912. He studied philosophy at the Charles University in Prague, and later obtained a diploma from the British Association of Industrial Editors. He wrote professionally from the age of 17 and became fluent in Hungarian, Czech and English.

Table tennis career
Between 1929 and 1936, Kelen won 15 medals in singles, doubles, and team events in the World Table Tennis Championships. This included seven gold medals: five in the team event and two in the mixed doubles with Anna Sipos at the 1929 World Table Tennis Championships and Mária Mednyánszky at the 1933 World Table Tennis Championships.

In the 1930s, Kelen was employed in Prague as a table tennis instructor by the Czech governing body. One of his students was world champion Stanislav Kolář. In 1936, he published Success at Table Tennis, a guide to the sport (1936: 1st edition. UK: Published by Frederick Warne & Co. Ltd).

In Australia
In 1937, Kelen and Miklos Szabados embarked on a two-year table tennis exhibition tour of the Far East and South America. They won the doubles tournament at the Australian national championships, and Szabados defeated Kelen in the singles final. They both chose to settle in Australia permanently.
In 1939, Kelen enlisted in the Australian Army. A member of the 66th Australian Infantry Battalion (Intelligence), he served in New Guinea, Halmahera, North Borneo, and finally as part of the British Commonwealth Occupation Force in Japan. He was a feature writer for the British Commonwealth Occupation Newspaper (BCON).

Back in Australia, Kelen worked for the Australian Broadcasting Corporation (ABC) as an author and journalist, writing documentaries and features. He later worked for Goodyear as a managing editor. He was president of the Sydney branch of PEN International (1975–1985), and a life member of the Australian Journalists Association. He won awards for short stories and plays that he authored. In 1983, he published an autobiography, I Remember Hiroshima.

Personal life
Kelen is the father of academic Christopher Kelen and poet S. K. Kelen.

See also
 List of table tennis players
 List of World Table Tennis Championships medalists

References

 Havas László: A magyar sport aranykönyve – Budapest, 1982 – 
 Révai új lexikona XI. (Kad–Kla). Főszerk. Kollega Tarsoly István. Szekszárd: Babits. 2002. 
 Magyar Ki Kicsoda 1990 – 
 Asztalitenisz egyéni és páros országos bajnokok
 Magyar asztalitenisz csapatbajnokok (PDF)
 Havas László: A magyar sport aranykönyve – Budapest, 1982 – 
Révai új lexikona XI. (Kad–Kla). Főszerk. Kollega Tarsoly István. Szekszárd: Babits. 2002. 
Magyar Ki Kicsoda 1990 – 
Asztalitenisz egyéni és páros országos bajnokok
Magyar asztalitenisz csapatbajnokok (PDF)

1912 births
2003 deaths
Hungarian male table tennis players
Hungarian emigrants to Australia
Australian male dramatists and playwrights
Australian Army personnel of World War II
Hungarian expatriate sportspeople in the Czech Republic
Charles University alumni
Recipients of the Medal of the Order of Australia
Table tennis players from Budapest
Writers from Budapest
20th-century Australian journalists
Australian Army officers